Dr. Thomas E. Randle High School is a public high school in unincorporated Fort Bend County, Texas, with a Richmond postal address. It is a part of the Lamar Consolidated Independent School District (LCISD).

Its boundary includes portions of Rosenberg, most of Pleak, and all of Kendleton. It also includes the unincorporated area of Powell Point.

History
It is named after a former superintendent. It opened in August 2021 as the school district's sixth high school, and was formally dedicated the following month. 

The school colors and mascot were chosen by a 2020 survey of area middle and high school students. The mascot chosen was the lions, and the school colors selected were black and silver.

It opened with grades 9 and 10, and will expand to other grades later.

References

External links
 Randle High School

Lamar Consolidated Independent School District high schools
2021 establishments in Texas
Educational institutions established in 2021